Football Club Villefranche Beaujolais or simply Villefranche is a French association football club founded in 1927. They are based in Villefranche-sur-Saône, Rhône-Alpes and play at the Stade Armand Chouffet in town. The team played one season in the second tier of French football during the 1980s. Since the 2018–19 season they play in the Championnat National, the third tier in the French football league system.

History
Football Club Villefranche-Beaujolais was formed in 1927, from the football section of multi-sports club Cercle Sportif de Villefranche. The Beaujolais suffix of the name had been applied by 1985, the club being previously known as Football Club Villefranche.

The club debuted in the national league structure in 1953 when champions of the Lyonnais region of Division d'Honneur they promoted to Division Nationale, the highest tier of amateur football. They maintained this level for five seasons, then relegated in 1958. Promotion to the Division Nationale in 1966 would follow when they were Lyonnaise regional champions. They relegated in 1969.

In 1970 the club gained access to the Division Nationale for a third time. By successfully remaining in the division, the club became part of the third tier of French football when the FFF reorganised the leagues at the end of the 1970–71 season, taking part in the first edition of Division 3 in 1971. They remained that level until relegated to the regional league in 1976.

FC Villefranche were founding members in 1978 when the FFF introduced a fourth division to the national league, having finished 6th in the regional Division d'Honneur the previous season. They maintained this level for the season with an 11th place finish. A third place season finish in 1979–80, promoted them to Division 3. In 1983 they were promoted to Division 2 although finishing in third place when the two higher placed teams became ineligible for promotion.

The club stayed just one season in Division 2, finishing bottom of Group A and being relegated back to Division 3. They remained at that level until finishing bottom of their group in 1988, and in 1989 suffered a second successive relegation back to the regional league.

In 1993 the FFF introduced a fifth tier, and the club secured a place in the new National 3 division as champions of the Division Honneur (now the Rhône-Alpes region, after internal restructuring of the French regional leagues). After a fourth place finish in their group in 1994 they secured promotion in 1995 by finishing second in their group. The club completed three seasons of mid-table finishes before being relegated in 2000 and 2001.

As champions of the Division d'Honneur in 2004, they promoted to CFA2. In 2008, they won their group and were promoted to the fourth tier, CFA. The remained at this level until successfully gaining promotion to Championnat National as winners of their group in the 2017–18 season.

Crest

Current squad

References

Association football clubs established in 1927
1927 establishments in France
Sport in Villefranche-sur-Saône
Football clubs in Auvergne-Rhône-Alpes